Angustialata is a genus of moths in the family Gelechiidae. It contains the only species Angustialata gemmellaformis, which is found in Korea, China, the Russian Far East and Japan.

References

Gelechiinae
Monotypic moth genera
Moths of Asia
Litini